Just William is a United Kingdom television series first broadcast on BBC One in December 2010. The series is based on the Just William series of books by Richmal Crompton. This latest adaptation is written by Simon Nye. It is the first adaption of the books since a children's television series in the 1990s.

The series stars Daniel Roche as the title character, eponymous character William Brown, with Rebecca Front and Daniel Ryan as William's parents. Caroline Quentin and Warren Clarke appear as the parents of Violet Elizabeth Bott (played by Isabella Blake-Thomas), neighbours of the Brown family. It is directed by Paul Seed and produced by John Chapman.

Martin Jarvis, who voices the radio and audio CD adaptions of Just William, acts as the narrator. Various sources suggest that the series will not be returning.

Background
British author Richmal Crompton had a series of books published between 1919 and 1969 about the adventures of schoolboy William Brown and his group of friends, also known as the "Outlaws". Crompton, a schoolteacher, wrote her first novel in 1922 and went on to sell over 12 million copies of her books in the United Kingdom.

The first film adaption of the novels, titled Just William, was released in 1940, and this was followed by two further films in 1948. A radio series was also broadcast on the BBC around the same period. The books were also adapted for television, firstly as William in the 1960s, then as Just William in the 1970s and again under the same title in the 1990s.

Production
The producers chose to set the film in the 1950s, just following the conclusion of World War II, despite many of the books being written in the preceding three decades. The series was filmed in the Home Counties. The screenplay was written by Simon Nye. Daniel Roche was cast in the title role as William Brown, the main character and leader of "The Outlaws" along with his friends Ginger, Douglas and Henry.

Ten year old Roche had received critical acclaim for his performances as Ben in the BBC comedy series Outnumbered. Isabella Blake-Thomas, who appeared in the BBC Four television film Enid, got the part of Violet Elizabeth Bott, William's neighbour. Due to the setting of the series, Roche had to have his trademark curly hair cut short.

Cast and characters

 Daniel Roche as William Brown
 Daniel Ryan as Mr Brown
 Rebecca Front as Mrs Brown
 Lily James as Ethel Brown
 Harry Melling as Robert Brown
 Bertie Carvel as Uncle Neville 
 Isabella Blake-Thomas as Violet Elizabeth Bott
 Warren Clarke as Mr Bott
 Caroline Quentin as Mrs Bott
 Jordan Grehs as Ginger
 Edward Piercy as Douglas
 Lottie Bell as Dorinda
 Robert A. Foster as Henry
 Adam Gillen as Hector
 Denis Lawson as Headmaster
 John Sessions as Mr Welbecker
 Roy Hudd as Bob
 Martin Jarvis as the Narrator
 Ruby Stokes as Grumpy Girl

Broadcast
The series, which consists of four half-hour episodes, aired as part of the BBC's Christmas programming from 28 to 31 December 2010 on CBBC on BBC One.< The series was broadcast on CBBC from 8 to 16 January 2011.

DVD release
The first four episodes were released to DVD on 7 March 2011, under the title, Just William, Series One, which hints that there might be a second series, although this seems unlikely.

References

External links
 
 

BBC Television shows
Just William
2010s British children's television series
2010 British television series debuts
2010 British television series endings
BBC children's television shows